The Samuel Brooks House is located on Pleasant Hill Road north of the hamlet of Mountainville in the Town of Cornwall, New York, United States. It is a cottage in a mix of Victorian architectural styles, most notably Carpenter Gothic and Stick Style, built around 1860.

Its location, near Schunemunk Mountain, and architecture made it a desirable location for the summer boarders who made Cornwall a popular resort community in the late 19th century. It survives mostly intact today. In 1996 it was listed on the National Register of Historic Places (NRHP).

Property

The house sits back from Pleasant Hill Road at the end of a semicircular driveway. There are two barns near it, both part of Brooks' original farm, long since subdivided. Both are considered contributing resources to the NRHP listing.

Two and a half stories high with a setback southern wing one story shorter, the five-bay house is sided in clapboard. Its cross-gabled roof, shingled in asphalt, is trimmed with a plain molded cornice with plain frieze and ornate carved vergeboards in the gables, framing a pointed-arch window with hood molding on the more-visible southern and eastern faces. A brick chimney rises from the north end.

A small wooden front entrance porch has a flat roof, bracketed cornice, piers with similar capitals and a cutout railing in between, and a plain frieze. The wing and west (rear) face have similar porches without the cutouts.

The paneled wooden door leads to a central hall.

Behind the house is a two-story vertical-sided wooden barn with a cross-gabled roof shingled in wood. The other barn, to the northwest, is sided in wood shingles with a gabled asphalt roof. Both are remnants of the original farm.

History

Brooks, a descendant of one of Cornwall's oldest families, built this as a farmhouse around 1860. After the Civil War, summer boarders from New York City began coming to Cornwall, and Brooks quickly adapted it for use as a boardinghouse.

The house has remained a residence ever since. Since September 2008, it has been for sale.

References

External links
September 2008 listing at realtor.com

Houses on the National Register of Historic Places in New York (state)
Houses in Orange County, New York
National Register of Historic Places in Orange County, New York
Houses completed in 1860
Cornwall, New York